The 1990 Taça de Portugal Final was the final match of the 1989–90 Taça de Portugal, the 50th season of the Taça de Portugal, the premier Portuguese football cup competition organized by the Portuguese Football Federation (FPF). The final was played at the Estádio Nacional in Oeiras, and opposed Primeira Liga side Estrela da Amadora and Second Division side Farense. As the inaugural final match finished 1–1, the final was replayed a week later at the same venue with Os Tricolor  defeating the Leões de Faro 2–0 to claim their first Taça de Portugal.

In Portugal, the final was televised live on RTP. As a result of Estrela da Amadora winning the Taça de Portugal, they qualified for the 1990 Supertaça Cândido de Oliveira where they took on 1989–90 Primeira Divisão winners Porto.

Match

Details

Replay

Details

References

1990
1989–90 in Portuguese football
C.F. Estrela da Amadora matches
S.C. Farense matches